Yves Robillard  (born 1942) is a Canadian politician, who was elected to represent the riding of Marc-Aurèle-Fortin in the House of Commons of Canada in the 2015 Canadian federal election.

He has sat on two committees, the Standing Committee on National Defence and the Standing Committee on Human Resources, Skills and Social Development and the Status of Persons with Disabilities. Because of his experience and abilities, Yves is often tasked with official representations on the international scene.

On December 22, 2021, Robillard was removed from the Standing Committee on National Defence. This was in response to Robillard having been discovered to have partaken in non-essential travel outside of Canada, disregarding an advisory against such activity.

Electoral record

References

External links

1942 births
Canadian public relations people
Liberal Party of Canada MPs
Living people
Members of the House of Commons of Canada from Quebec
Politicians from Laval, Quebec
People from Verdun, Quebec
Politicians from Montreal
Political consultants from Quebec
21st-century Canadian politicians